Alberto Vázquez-Figueroa (born 11 October 1936 in Santa Cruz de Tenerife, Canary Islands) is a Spanish novelist, inventor and industrialist. His novels have sold over 25 million copies worldwide. He is the owner of A.V.F.S.L, a desalinization company that uses a method of desalinization by pressure, invented by himself.

Biography
Vázquez-Figueroa and his family fled from the Canary Islands to Africa during the Spanish Civil War. Since his youth, he visited the Sahara and described the culture of the desert region. He was a war correspondent in La Vanguardia, for TVE (Televisión Española) and for the program  with de la Cuadra Salcedo and Silva. As a correspondent, he documented revolutionary wars in countries such as Bolivia, the Dominican Republic, and Guatemala.

He later wrote his first novel,  (Sand and Wind), and in 1975, he published as many as 14 to 15 novellas such as Ébano. His novel Tuareg was cinematized in 1984 by director Enzo G. Castellari. His novel Iguana was cinematized in 1988 by Monte Hellman. His novel Garoé (the name of a sacred tree in the Canary Islands) won the 2010 Historical Novel Prize Alfonso X El Sabio, valued at €100,000. He has also published an autobiography entitled Anaconda.

He is also a screenwriter and film director and has made such films as Oro rojo.

Literature
 Tuareg (1980)
 Tras las huellas de Alec (1971)
 Serie Cienfuegos
 Cienfuegos (1987)
 Caribes (Caribs)
 Saud el Leopardo (2009)
 Azabache
 Montenegro
 Brazofuerte
 Xaraguá
 Tierra de bisontes (Land of the bisons)
 Olvidar Machu-Picchu (1983)
 Manaos
 Viracocha
 Anaconda
 Nuevos dioses
 El agua prometida
 La ordalía del veneno
 Marea negra
 Fuerteventura
 Serie Océano (Ocean Series):
Isla de Lobos ( Océano)
Yaiza
Maradentro
 Serie Piratas (Pirate Series):
 Piratas (1996)
 Negreros
 Leon Bocanegra
 Tiempo de conquistadores (2000)
 Un mundo mejor (2002)
 El señor de las tinieblas
 El anillo verde
 Delfines (Dolphins)
 La ruta de Orellana
 La Iguana
 Ícaro
 Bora Bora
 Ébano (1974)
 ¡Panamá, Panamá!
 Tierra virgen. La destrucción del Amazonas
 El inca (The Inca)
 Los ojos del tuareg (2000)
 Vendaval
 Ciudadano Max
 África llora
 Marfil
 Sicario
 Palmira
 ¿Quién mató al embajador?
 Como un perro rabioso ( El perro)
 Matar a Gadafi (1997)
 Vivir del viento
 El rey leproso (2005)
 Bajo siete mares
 Por mil millones de dólares (2007)
 Coltan (2008)

Filmography
El perro, directed by Antonio Isasi-Isasmendi (1977, based on the novel El perro)
Oro rojo, directed by Alberto Vázquez-Figueroa (1978)
Ashanti, directed by Richard Fleischer (1979, based on the novel Ébano)
Manaos, directed by Alberto Vázquez-Figueroa (1979, based on the novel Manaos)
Last Harem, directed by Sergio Garrone (1981, based on the novel El último harén)
Tuareg – The Desert Warrior, directed by Enzo G. Castellari (1984, based on the novel Tuareg)
Crystal Heart, directed by Gil Bettman (1986)
Iguana, directed by Monte Hellman (1988, based on the novel Iguana)
Rottweiler, directed by Brian Yuzna (2004, based on the novel El perro)

References

External links
Alberto Vázquez-Figueroa's Official English Website
About Alberto Vázquez-Figueroa

1936 births
Living people
People from Santa Cruz de Tenerife
Writers from the Canary Islands
Spanish inventors
20th-century Spanish writers
20th-century Spanish male writers
21st-century Spanish writers
Spanish film directors
Spanish screenwriters